Xcommunication is the seventh album by jazz fusion band Brand X, released in 1992. It was the band's first studio release in more than a decade.

Track listing
All tracks written by John Goodsall, except where noted.

"Xanax Taxi" – 5:57
"Liquid Time" – 4:39
"Kluzinski Period" (Percy Jones) – 7:00
"Healing Dream" – 3:51
"Mental Floss" – 3:17
"Strangeness" (Jones) – 3:23
"A Duck Exploding" (Goodsall, Jones) – 6:47
"Message to You" – 0:25
"Church of Hype" (Jones) – 5:54
"Kluzinski Reprise" (Goodsall, Jones) – 4:25

Personnel
 John Goodsall – guitar, MIDI-guitar
 Percy Jones – fretless bass
 Frank Katz – drums

Additional personnel
 Danny Wilding – flute on "Kluzinski Reprise"

References

1992 albums
Brand X albums